Jose Alvarado (born April 12, 1998) is an American professional basketball player for the New Orleans Pelicans of the National Basketball Association (NBA). He is nicknamed "Grand Theft Alvarado" (a play on the name of the popular video game Grand Theft Auto) due to his abilities in stealing. Alvarado represents Puerto Rico internationally. He played college basketball for the Georgia Tech Yellow Jackets.

Early life and high school career
Alvarado played football in his childhood but quit after injuring his neck. He played basketball for Christ the King Regional High School in Middle Village, Queens in New York City. As a junior, Alvarado averaged 17 points and 6.5 assists per game and was named Catholic High School Athletic Association (CHSAA) Player of the Year. As a senior, he recorded 18 points, 10 rebounds, 10 assists and 10 steals, the first quadruple-double in school history, in a December 22, 2016, win over Xaverian High School. In his senior season, Alvarado averaged 17.9 points per game and led Christ the King to the CHSAA intersectional quarterfinals. He was named TimesLedger Player of the Year.

Recruiting
Alvarado was considered a four-star recruit by ESPN and Rivals and a three-star recruit by 247Sports in the 2017 class. On September 15, 2016, he committed to play college basketball for Georgia Tech over offers from Rutgers and Seton Hall, among others. Georgia Tech head coach Josh Pastner had first seen Alvarado at the Nike Elite Youth Basketball League.

College career
As a freshman, Alvarado started in all 25 of his games and averaged 12.1 points, 3.7 rebounds and 3.1 assists per game. He became the fourth Georgia Tech freshman to average at least 12 points, 3.5 rebounds, and two assists per game. He suffered a season-ending left elbow fracture against Duke on February 11, 2018. Alvarado had an increased role in his sophomore season with the early departure of Josh Okogie. On February 20, 2019, Alvarado scored a career-high 29 points to go with six rebounds and five assists in a 73–65 win over Pittsburgh. As a sophomore, Alvarado averaged 12.5 points, 3.9 rebounds and 3.4 assists per game, leading his team in scoring, assists and steals. Georgia Tech was banned from the postseason by the NCAA during his junior season due to several infractions. He missed seven games early in his junior season due to an ankle injury. On January 25, 2020, Alvarado scored a season-high 26 points and recorded eight rebounds and a school-record nine steals in a 64–58 victory over NC State. In his junior season, he averaged 14.4 points, four assists, 3.4 rebounds and 2.2 steals per game and was named to the Third Team All-Atlantic Coast Conference (ACC). In his senior year, Alvarado and Moses Wright led Georgia Tech to its first ACC title since 1993, by defeating Scottie Barnes and Florida State in the championship game of the ACC tournament. At the end of the season, was named the ACC Defensive Player of the Year.

Professional career

New Orleans Pelicans (2021–present) 
Alvarado passed on gaining an additional year in college due to COVID-19 game cancellations and declared himself eligible for the 2021 NBA draft. After being undrafted, on August 19, 2021, he signed a two-way contract with the New Orleans Pelicans. Under the terms of the deal, he split time with the Pelicans and their NBA G League affiliate, the Birmingham Squadron. During a game against the Philadelphia 76ers on January 25, 2022, Alvarado was issued a technical foul after an in-game verbal altercation with Philadelphia center Joel Embiid. The incident received press coverage after Embiid praised Alvarado and paid the $2,000 league fine associated with it. On March 28, Alvarado's two-way deal was converted into a standard 4-year, $6.5 million contract. This signing made him eligible for post-season play.

On December 4, 2022, Alvarado scored a career-high 38 points in a 121–106 win over the Denver Nuggets. On February 17, 2023, Alvarado won the Rising Stars Challenge MVP award after hitting the game-winning shot.

National team career
In FIBA competition, Alvarado is a member of the Puerto Rico men's national basketball team.

Career statistics

NBA

Regular season

|-
| style="text-align:left;"| 
| style="text-align:left;"| New Orleans
| 54 || 1 || 15.4 || .446 || .291 || .679 || 1.9 || 2.8 || 1.3 || .1 || 6.1
|- class="sortbottom"
| style="text-align:center;" colspan="2"| Career
| 54 || 1 || 15.4 || .446 || .291 || .679 || 1.9 || 2.8 || 1.3 || .1 || 6.1

Playoffs

|-
| style="text-align:left;"|2022
| style="text-align:left;"|New Orleans
| 6 || 0 || 19.5 || .485 || .375 || .769 || 1.3 || 1.5 || 1.2 || .2 || 8.0
|- class="sortbottom"
| style="text-align:center;" colspan="2"|Career
| 6 || 0 || 19.5 || .485 || .375 || .769 || 1.3 || 1.5 || 1.2 || .2 || 8.0

College

|-
| style="text-align:left;"| 2017–18
| style="text-align:left;"| Georgia Tech
| 25 || 25 || 35.0 || .448 || .370 || .802 || 3.7 || 3.1 || 1.7 || .1 || 12.1
|-
| style="text-align:left;"| 2018–19
| style="text-align:left;"| Georgia Tech
| 31 || 30 || 34.2 || .392 || .286 || .743 || 3.9 || 3.4 || 1.8 || .1 || 12.5
|-
| style="text-align:left;"| 2019–20
| style="text-align:left;"| Georgia Tech
| 24 || 23 || 33.5 || .444 || .336 || .793 || 3.4 || 4.0 || 2.2 || .1 || 14.4
|-
| style="text-align:left;"| 2020–21
| style="text-align:left;"| Georgia Tech
| 26 || 26 || 37.1 || .504 || .390 || .838 || 3.5 || 4.1 || 2.8 || .0 || 15.2
|- class="sortbottom"
| style="text-align:center;" colspan="2"| Career
| 106 || 104 || 34.9 || .444 || .341 || .790 || 3.6 || 3.6 || 2.1 || .1 || 13.5

Personal life
Alvarado is of Puerto Rican and Mexican heritage. He and his girlfriend have a daughter who was born in 2020.

References

External links
 Jose Alvarado at Georgia Tech Yellow Jackets
 

Living people
1998 births
American sportspeople of Mexican descent
Basketball players from New York City
Birmingham Squadron players
Georgia Tech Yellow Jackets men's basketball players
New Orleans Pelicans players
Point guards
Puerto Rican men's basketball players
Sportspeople from Brooklyn
Undrafted National Basketball Association players